The following are the national records in speed skating in Italy maintained by the Federazione Italiana Sport del Ghiaccio (FISG).

Men

Women

References

External links
 FISG web site

National records in speed skating
Records
Speed skating
Speed skating-related lists
Speed skating